The Condyle of humerus is the distal end of the humerus. It is made up of the capitulum and the trochlea.

References

Anatomy